Arik Bista (born 17 March 2000) is a Nepalese professional footballer who plays as a midfielder for Martyr's Memorial A-Division League club New Road Team (NRT) and the Nepal national team. He made his international national debut against Bangladesh on 13 November 2020 in Dhaka.

References

2000 births
Living people
Nepalese footballers
Nepal youth international footballers
Nepal international footballers
Association football midfielders
Nepal Super League players